Room 93 is the debut extended play (EP) by American singer and songwriter Halsey. It was released on October 27, 2014 by Astralwerks. The project was re-released digitally on March 9, 2015, including a new version of its main single "Ghost"; this new version was later also included on the singer's debut full-length studio album Badlands (2015). The sound of the EP is rooted on the electropop music genre. A digital remix version of the EP, featuring three remixes for the songs "Hurricane", "Ghost" and "Trouble" was released on March 3, 2015. Along with the remix EP, a "One Mic, One Take" EP was released on the same date. The track "Trouble" was featured on the promo for the episode "Best Laid Plans" from the American TV series Once Upon a Time.

Critical reception

The EP received a generally positive response. AllMusic gave it three and a half out of five stars.

Track listing

Notes
 signifies a co-producer.

Charts

Release history

References 

2014 debut EPs
Halsey (singer) EPs
Astralwerks EPs
Virgin EMI Records EPs